The following is a list of all albums that have spent at least 150 weeks on the UK Albums Chart as published by the Official Charts Company (OCC). The chart comprises a top 100 from August 1981 to 1988 and since 1994, a top 75 before this (and from 1988 to 1994) from 1978 and various lengths before this from July 1956. Re-releases – such as remasters, re-issues, deluxe versions or anniversary editions – are treated together unless the re-released version differs significantly from the original (for example, it has been re-recorded or remixed). This list does not include compilation albums by various artists, which have been excluded from the UK Albums Chart since 1989. Soundtracks are still included if they are an original cast performance or if all tracks are performed by the same artist.

The top three are all compilation albums, headed by Queen's Greatest Hits which has spent 1358 weeks in the top 100, ABBA Gold: Greatest Hits, with 1095 weeks on the chart, followed by Legend by Bob Marley and the Wailers with 1070 weeks. The most weeks for a studio album is 984 for Rumours by Fleetwood Mac which charted every year from its release in 1977 until 1989 and in fifteen different years since then.

Amy Winehouse's 2006 album Back to Black has the most weeks for a post-2000 release, charting for 535 weeks to date, though this total includes 55 weeks for the deluxe edition and 1 week for the box set that includes Back to Black and Winehouse's debut album Frank. The original soundtrack of South Pacific has the most weeks at number 1, with 115. The most weeks by an album not reaching number 1 is 557 for Dark Side of the Moon by Pink Floyd and the most weeks by an album not reaching the top 10 is 282 for Singles by Maroon 5.

Dire Straits, Michael Jackson and U2 jointly hold the record for most albums to reach 100 weeks on chart, with five each. Of these, three albums by both Dire Straits and Jackson have achieved 200 weeks on chart; in the case of Dire Straits, all of them studio albums (Brothers in Arms, Making Movies and Love over Gold). The only other acts to have three albums reach 200 weeks on chart are Oasis, Adele and Ed Sheeran.

Five acts have multiple albums achieving 300 weeks on chart: Fleetwood Mac, Oasis, Ed Sheeran, Simon & Garfunkel and Arctic Monkeys. Of these, Oasis is the only act to have three albums pass the 300-week threshold, all of which subsequently passed the 400-week threshold. This made them the first act with multiple albums achieving 400 weeks on the chart, and they remain the only act with three albums having reached this milestone. Sheeran would become the second act to have two albums achieve 400 weeks on the chart in 2022.

The numbers shown are up to the chart for the week ending 23 March 2023.

(*) indicates that the album is in the top 100 for the current week ending.

400 or more weeks

200 to 399 weeks

150 to 199 weeks

Artists with the most entries
The following artists have 2 or more albums charting on the UK Album Charts for more than 150 weeks

See also
 List of songs which have spent the most weeks on the UK Singles Chart

Notes

Books
 British Albums Chart: All Time Top 1000 by Michael Churchill. Published by Lulu.com, 2013.

References

UK charts
British record charts
Lists of record chart achievements